'MP-203' is an unfinished motorway in Madrid, Spain that connects from Mejorada del Campo to San Fernando de Henares. Its construction goal was to reduce the traffic congestion on the A-2 motorway by providing an alternative motorway route for drivers. The construction of the highway was started in 2005, with 70 million Euros being spent on the construction. However, in 2007, the construction of this highway was suspended due to the issues regarding the Madrid–Barcelona high-speed rail line, the connection to the R-3 motorway, and also the period of great recession in Spain. As a result, only 70% of the route was completed.

References

Transport in the Community of Madrid